Hanse is a brand of sailing yachts that was created by Michael Schmidt in 1993. It is the core brand of German yacht manufacturer HanseYachts, Greifswald. The current range comprises 9 models from 32 to 69 ft in length. Naval architect for all models since 1999 was the German yacht design studio Judel/Vrolijk & Co, Bremerhaven. In 2021, the French designers Berret-Racoupeau followed in this footsteps with their first Hanse model 460.

Current models (specs) 
Weights and measures (metric)

1 Standard version, 2 Sail area to displacement ratio (standard version)

Weights and measures (imperial)

1 Standard version, 2 Sail area to displacement ratio (standard version)

External links

References 

German brands